In process engineering Wet process may refer to:

Wet sulfuric acid process for the manufacture of Sulphuric acid
Any wet process in textile engineering, see Wet processing engineering
The wet process in Coffee production
The wet process in Coconut oil production
The wet process used in cement manufacture in Cement kilns
A wet process in the manufacture of Separators for electrochemical cells
The wet process for the production of Phosphoric acid from  sulfuric acid and tricalcium phosphate rock
The wet process or "Mason method" for the manufacture of Hardboard